A money shot is a particularly expensive or valuable cinematic sequence.

Money shot could also refer to:

Music
Money Shot (album), the third studio album by the band Puscifer, or the title track
"Money Shot", a 2004 song by Katastrophy Wife from All Kneel
"Money Shot", a 2020 song by AC/DC from Power Up

Television
"Money Shot" (The Shield), the third episode of the seventh season of The Shield television series
Xanadu (TV series), a 2011 French television series known as The Money Shot in the US

Other uses
 Money shot, a cum shot in adult film